Miocamycin is a macrolide antibiotic. It has a spectrum activity similar to that of Erythromycin, but shows higher antimicrobial effect against certain bacteria including Legionella pneumophila (the causative agent of Legionnaires' Disease), Mycoplasma hominis, and Ureaplasma urealyticum. In-vivo studies have further expounded on Miocamycin's efficacy, reporting that the medication is more effective than in-vitro data suggests.

References 

Macrolide antibiotics
Propionate esters
Acetate esters